Vergüenza Ajena: Made in Spain is an American comedy clip show that began airing on May 9, 2016. It is hosted by Luis Fernández and co-hosted by Mbaka Oko and Corina Randazzo. Ridiculousness shows various viral videos from the Internet.

Production
Viacom International Media Networks (VIMN)'s South Europe, Middle East and South Africa cluster produced five new versions of entertainment format Ridiculousness for local MTV channels. The new programmes will air on MTV Spain, MTV France, MTV Italy, MTV Africa and the MTV Netherlands and MTV Belgium.

The clip-show format first, Ridiculousness, aired on MTV in the US in 2011 and sees a regular studio team and guest stars commenting on viral ‘fail’ videos from the internet.

Episodes

Series overview

References

External links
 

MTV original programming